"Ragtag" is the twenty-first episode of the first season of the American television series Agents of S.H.I.E.L.D., based on the Marvel Comics organization S.H.I.E.L.D. (Strategic Homeland Intervention, Enforcement and Logistics Division), revolving around the character of Phil Coulson and his team of S.H.I.E.L.D. agents as they search for a secret Hydra base. It is set in the Marvel Cinematic Universe (MCU), sharing continuity with the films of the franchise. The episode was written by Jeffrey Bell, and directed by Roxann Dawson.

Clark Gregg reprises his role as Coulson from the film series, and is joined by series regulars Ming-Na Wen, Brett Dalton, Chloe Bennet, Iain De Caestecker, and Elizabeth Henstridge.

"Ragtag" originally aired on ABC on May 6, 2014, and according to Nielsen Media Research, was watched by 5.37 million viewers.

Plot 
In flashbacks, a teenage Grant Ward is seen in juvenile detention where he first meets John Garrett, and accepts his offer to join his organization, SHIELD. Over the years, Garrett trains Ward, and eventually tells him about Hydra and their presence within SHIELD.

In the present, Phil Coulson's team realize Cybertek Industries is a front for Hydra, and decide to investigate them to find out what Garrett is planning and stop him, despite not being officially sanctioned to do so (with Leo Fitz describing them as vigilantes). Antoine Triplett provides the team with 1940s SSR gadgets, which belonged to his grandfather, a Howling Commando. Coulson and May infiltrate a Cybertek facility posing as scientists, so they can remotely trigger a Trojan virus on Skye's hard drive, which will hack the Cybertek mainframe and give them access to Hydra's systems. They discover that Cybertek only keeps hard copies, to avoid being hacked, but they find a file on Project Deathlok, and learn that Garrett was the first test subject in 1990: after he was injured on a mission and received no help from SHIELD, he turned against them and joined Hydra, from whom he received cybernetic implants to save his life. The team realize that Garrett wants GH325 for himself, as his organs are failing and he is near death, but he is willing to also use GH325 to perfect the Centipede serum for Hydra's use.

While Garrett relocates Hydra's operations to a new Cybertek facility in the US, Raina reveals extensive information to Ward regarding Skye's origins, including the revelation that Skye's parents were the 'monsters' which killed the villagers protecting her. Tracking Cybertek shipments, the team realize that Hydra is using the Cuban SHIELD base. Coulson, May, Skye and Triplett go to the base to activate the Trojan program, and are attacked by several Centipede soldiers and a Hydra operative wielding the Berserker staff. Meanwhile, Fitz and Jemma Simmons search for the Bus and are captured by Ward, but Fitz uses an electromagnetic pulse device to damage Garrett's implants. Crippled, Garrett orders Ward to execute Fitz and Simmons, who lock themselves inside a medical unit, which Ward ejects from the plane, into the ocean. Having synthesized GH325 from the assorted T.A.H.I.T.I. drugs, Raina injects the sample into Garrett's Centipede serum intravenous filter, saving him.

In an end tag, Ian Quinn meets with generals in Washington to sell the Deathlok concept to the military.

Production

Development 
In April 2014, Marvel revealed that the twenty-first episode would be titled "Ragtag", and would be written by executive producer Jeffrey Bell, with Roxann Dawson directing.

Writing 
On the episode's focus on Grant Ward, Bell said, "Ward is showing all these different colors, and we thought it might be fun to show how Ward became Ward. Nothing definitive, because we’re still driving towards our conclusion with Deathlok and Raina and Garrett and Quinn and our cavalcade of bad guys, but Ward really is front and center in this episode...I really do feel Ward is trapped between two families, or the two pulls. Because as we learned, he really does care for Skye. And I do believe he cares for Fitz and Simmons and the whole team, to a certain extent, and that he was following orders. On the other hand, he has this deathly obligation to Garrett". About the title, Bell explained, "The episode is called “ragtag” and they’ve kind of lost everything. Maria Hill has told us as much, that there’s no more S.H.I.E.L.D., and so how do we go on and how does Coulson carry forward, when the organization that he believed in more than anything is disbanded? It seems like S.H.I.E.L.D. or no S.H.I.E.L.D. our team has to try and bring Garrett and Ward to some sort of justice and conclusion, and that’s where we’re speeding towards."

Casting 
In April 2014, Marvel revealed that main cast members Clark Gregg, Ming-Na Wen, Brett Dalton, Chloe Bennet, Iain De Caestecker, and Elizabeth Henstridge would star as Phil Coulson, Melinda May, Grant Ward, Skye, Leo Fitz, and Jemma Simmons, respectively. It was also revealed that the guest cast for the episode would include Bill Paxton as Agent John Garrett, B. J. Britt as Agent Antoine Triplett; Ruth Negga as Raina; David Conrad as Ian Quinn; J. August Richards as Mike Peterson. Glenn Morshower also guest stars, portraying General Jacobs. Paxton, Britt, Negga, Conrad, and Richards reprise their roles from earlier in the series.

Filming 
Filming occurred from March 19 to March 31, 2014.

Release

Broadcast 
"Ragtag" was first aired in the United States on ABC on May 6, 2014.

Marketing 
For the final six episodes, Marvel began the "Marvel's Agents of S.H.I.E.L.D.: The Art of Level Seven" initiative, in which a different image was released each Thursday before a new episode, depicting a first look at a key event from the upcoming episode. Bell stated that the initiative was a way to tie the series back to its comics roots, and was thought of at the beginning of the season. The production team tried to pair specific artists to the teaser posters based on their previous work and how it connected to the themes and emotion of the intended episode. The poster for "Ragtag", created by Emma Ríos, depicts significant moments in Ward’s life, as well as Fitz–Simmons in danger, and Skye looming behind the S.H.I.E.L.D. logo, as if she is a presence that Ward cannot seem to shake. Rios wanted the poster to have narrative aspects, trying to "reflect Ward's struggle in the reflection, as if it were a mirror, and have people thinking about what may have been happening inside Ward's brain".

Home media 
The episode, along with the rest of Agents of S.H.I.E.L.D.s first season, was released on Blu-ray and DVD on September 9, 2014. Bonus features include behind-the-scenes featurettes, audio commentary, deleted scenes, and a blooper reel. On November 20, 2014, the episode became available for streaming on Netflix.

Reception

Ratings 
In the United States the episode received a 1.9/6 percent share among adults between the ages of 18 and 49, meaning that it was seen by 1.9 percent of all households, and 6 percent of all of those watching television at the time of the broadcast. It was watched by 5.37 million viewers.

References

External links 
"Ragtag" at ABC

Agents of S.H.I.E.L.D. (season 1) episodes
2014 American television episodes
Havana in fiction
Television episodes set in Cuba
Television episodes directed by Roxann Dawson